Oak Grove High School is a public junior and senior high school in Oak Grove, Louisiana, United States, and a part of the West Carroll Parish School Board.

Athletics
Oak Grove High athletics competes in the LHSAA.

Championships
Football championships
(6) State Championships: 1989, 1991, 1999, 2001, 2019, 2020

Football
Coaches
 Vic Dalrymple - LHSAA Hall of Fame head football coach, Vic Dalrymple, was head coach at Oak Grove High from 1981 to 2012. During his thirty-two seasons at the school, he compiled a 320–99–0 record and won fifteen district championships and four state championships in 1989, 1991, 1999, and 2001. His teams were state runners-up in 1986, 1997, and 2004.

References

External links
 

Schools in West Carroll Parish, Louisiana
Public high schools in Louisiana
Public middle schools in Louisiana